Osaid Marah (born 26 May 1960) is a retired Sierra Leonean football goalkeeper. He was a squad member for the 1994 and 1996 African Cup of Nations.

References

1960 births
Living people
Sierra Leonean footballers
Sierra Leone international footballers
K.V.K. Tienen-Hageland players
Association football goalkeepers
Sierra Leonean expatriate footballers
Expatriate footballers in Belgium
Sierra Leonean expatriate sportspeople in Belgium
1994 African Cup of Nations players
1996 African Cup of Nations players